Neutrophil cytosol factor 1, also known as p47phox, is a protein that in humans is encoded by the NCF1 gene.

Function 

The protein encoded by this gene is a 47 kDa cytosolic subunit of neutrophil NADPH oxidase. This oxidase is a multicomponent enzyme that is activated to produce superoxide anion. Mutations in this gene have been associated with chronic granulomatous disease.

Genetic variability in the NCF1 gene has been found to be related to a higher chance of getting autoimmune diseases such as Sjögren's syndrome, rheumatoid arthritis and lupus erythematosus.

p47 is vital to the activation of NADPH oxidase. P47 becomes heavily phosphorylated

Interactions 

Neutrophil cytosolic factor 1 has been shown to interact with:
 Moesin, 
 Neutrophil cytosolic factor 4, and
 RELA.

References

Further reading